ACS Medicinal Chemistry Letters is a monthly peer-reviewed scientific journal covering medicinal chemistry. It was established in 2009 and is published by the American Chemical Society. The editor-in-chief is Dennis C. Liotta (Emory University).

According to the Journal Citation Reports, the journal has a 2021 impact factor of 4.632.

References

External links

Medicinal Chemistry Letters
English-language journals
Medicinal chemistry journals
Publications established in 2009
Monthly journals